Oeiras e São Julião da Barra, Paço de Arcos e Caxias is a civil parish in the municipality of Oeiras, Portugal. It was formed in 2013 by the merger of the former parishes Oeiras e São Julião da Barra, Paço de Arcos and Caxias. The population in 2011 was 33 827, in an area of 6.5 km².

References